Life Is a Beach is the fifth studio album by German DJ Sash!. It was released worldwide on 31 August 2012 by Tokapi Recordings. The record includes two singles "What Is Life" and "The Secret", featuring vocals of Sarah Brightman.

Track listing

Personnel
Sash!
Natasha Anderson
Annakiya
Sarah Brightman
Max Klaas

Credits
Produced by SASH! & Tokapi
Written by Ralf Kappmeier, Thomas Alisson, Sascha Lappessen
Featuring vocals by Natasha Anderson, Annakiya, Sarah Brightman, Max Klaas

References

2012 albums
Sash! albums